The HL7 Consolidated Clinical Document Architecture (C-CDA) is an XML-based markup standard which provides a library of CDA formatted documents. Clinical documents using the C-CDA standards are exchanged billions of times annually in the United States. All certified Electronic health records in the United States are required to export medical data using the C-CDA standard. While the standard was developed primarily for the United States as the C-CDA incorporates references to terminologies and value set required by US regulation, it has also been used internationally.

Content
There are 11 document types in the C-CDA standard

 Care Plan
 Consultation Note
 Continuity of Care Document
 Diagnostic Imaging Report
 Discharge Summary
 History and Physical
 Operative Note
 Procedure Note
 Progress Note
 Transfer Summary 
 Unstructured Document

References

Further reading

External links
 

Standards for electronic health records
Computer file formats
Industry-specific XML-based standards